Kirill Gotovets (born June 25, 1991) is a Belarusian professional ice hockey defenseman who is currently playing for HC Dynamo Moscow of the Kontinental Hockey League (KHL). He participated at the 2010 IIHF World Championship as a member of the Belarus National men's ice hockey team.

Playing career
He played for four years at Cornell University between 2010 and 2014. He was selected by the Tampa Bay Lightning as number 183 overall, in the seventh round of the 2009 NHL Entry Draft.

On April 2, 2013 his NHL rights were traded to the Chicago Blackhawks in exchange for Philippe Paradis. He was also a first round selection in the 2009 KHL Junior Draft. The following year on July 21, 2014, Gotovets signed a one-year AHL contract with Blackhawks affiliate, the Rockford IceHogs.

On June 12, 2015, Gotovets was signed to another one-year AHL contract with the Rockford IceHogs for the 2015-16 season.  Gotovets, who spent much of the 2014-15 season playing for the ECHL's Indy Fuel, was called up to Rockford towards the end of the regular season and saw further action in 8 Calder Cup Playoff matches, netting the game-winning goal in Game 1 of the Western Conference Quarterfinals.

After two seasons with the IceHogs, Gotovets left as a free agent to sign a one-year deal to return to Belarus with HC Dinamo Minsk of the Kontinental Hockey League on July 28, 2016. In the ensuing 2016-17 season, Gotovets added to the depth in the blueline, appearing in 24 games for 5 points.

On July 10, 2017, Gotovets opted to return to North America, agreeing to a one-year AHL contract with Canadian-based club, the Manitoba Moose, affiliate of the Winnipeg Jets. In the 2017-18 season, Gotovets secured a regular role on the blueline, appearing in 57 games and posting 13 points.

On May 28, 2018, Gotovets as a free agent opted to return to hometown club, HC Dinamo Minsk of the KHL, on a two-year contract.

After the conclusion of his contract with Dinamo, Gotovets continued in the KHL, moving to Russian club, Avangard Omsk, on a one-year contract on 12 May 2020.

Gotovets played two seasons with Avangard Omsk, claiming the Gagarin Cup in 2021, before leaving the club as a free agent and signing a two-year contract with HC Dynamo Moscow on 2 May 2022.

International play
Gotovets was named to the Belarus men's national ice hockey team for competition at the 2014 IIHF World Championship.

Career statistics

Regular season and playoffs

International

Awards and honours

References

External links

1991 births
Living people
Avangard Omsk players
Belarusian ice hockey defencemen
Cornell Big Red men's ice hockey players
HC Dinamo Minsk players
HC Dynamo Moscow players
Indy Fuel players
Manitoba Moose players
Milwaukee Admirals players
Ice hockey people from Minsk
Rockford IceHogs (AHL) players
Tampa Bay Lightning draft picks